The 2005–06 Hong Kong FA Cup was the 32nd staging of the Hong Kong FA Cup. The cup was won by Xiangxue Sun Hei who won 1-0 against Happy Valley in the final.

The competition started on 1 April 2006 with 8 Hong Kong First Division clubs. All matches were held in Mongkok Stadium.

The competition was officially known as 2007/2008 HKFA Lanwa International FA Cup due to sponsorship from LANWA Group Company Limited.

Teams
Buler Rangers
Citizen
Happy Valley
Hong Kong 08
Kitchee
Lanwa Redbull
South China
Xiangxue Sun Hei

Fixtures and results
All times are Hong Kong Time (UTC+8).

Bracket

Quarter-finals

Semi-finals

Final

Goalscorers

Prizes

Team awards
 Champion (HK$80,000): Xiangxue Sun Hei
 1st Runners-up (HK$20,000): Happy Valley
 Knock-out in the Semi-Finals (2 teams) (HK$10,000 each): Citizen, South China
 Knock-out in the Preliminary (4 teams) (HK$5,000 each): Buler Rangers, Hong Kong 08, Kitchee, Lanwa Redbull

Individual awards
 Top Scorer Award (HK$5,000):  Lico (Xiangxue Sun Hei)
 Best Defender Award (HK$5,000)

References

External links

2005-06
2006 domestic association football cups
FA